The East Branch South Fork Eel River, a tributary of the South Fork Eel River, is formed by the confluence of Cruso Cabin Creek and Elkhorn Creek, in Mendocino County in the U.S. state of California. Major tributaries of the East Branch include Buck Mountain Creek, Squaw Creek, Rays Creek, and Tom Long Creek. The river flows west, turns north, and flows west again, through rugged terrain in the Coast Range of California. The East Branch is the South Fork Eel's largest tributary.

Notes

References
 

Rivers of Mendocino County, California
Rivers of Northern California
Tributaries of the Eel River (California)